The Yinpan Dam is a gravity dam on the Wu River in Wulong County of Chongqing Municipality, China. The primary purpose of the dam is hydroelectric power production and navigation. It supports a 500-ton ship lift and a 600 MW power station. Construction on the project began in 2005 and it was completed in 2011 with the first generator commissioned in May of the same year, the fourth in December.

See also 

 List of dams and reservoirs in China
 List of tallest dams in China

References

Dams in China
Gravity dams
Dams completed in 2011
Hydroelectric power stations in Chongqing
Dams on the Wu River
Energy infrastructure completed in 2011